Sierosław may refer to the following places:
Sierosław, Greater Poland Voivodeship (west-central Poland)
Sierosław, Kuyavian-Pomeranian Voivodeship (north-central Poland)
Sierosław, Łódź Voivodeship (central Poland)
Sierosław, West Pomeranian Voivodeship (north-west Poland)